Dean Dill (born 8 March 1947) was a magician and effects designer who lived and worked in Glendale, California, USA.  He appeared on The Tonight Show in November 1990.  His performance focused mostly on closeup effects and coin magic. He created effects, including "Dean's Box," "Blizzard", and "A New World" (created with magic innovator Michael Weber).

He appeared on the cover of the October 2003 edition of The Linking Ring magazine. Dill died on 7 February 2015.

References 
 Kaplan, Martin. "Our Cover: Dean Dill", The Linking Ring, vol. 83 October 2003, 43–46.
 Dean Dill (Magicpedia)

External links
Dean Dill's website (archived)

2015 deaths
People from Glendale, California
American magicians
1947 births